Kabir Suman (born Suman Chattopadhyay; 16 March 1949) is an Indian music director, songwriter, singer, composer, politician, and former journalist.

From May 2009 to 2014, he was a member of parliament of India in the 15th Lok Sabha, having been elected from the Jadavpur constituency in Kolkata from All India Trinamool Congress.

He changed his name from Suman Chattopadhyay to Kabir Suman as he accepted Islam despite being a Hindu by birth. While explaining the reason of this religious transformation, he claimed his such move was to mark his protest against the killing of Christian missionary Graham Staines by a former member of Bajrang Dal. He shot to fame in the 1990s with bengali albums such as Tomake Chai (I Want You) and Boshe Anko (Sit-and-Draw).

Early life 

Suman was born in a Bengali Hindu Brahmin family on 16 March 1949 to Sudhindranath and Uma Chattopadhyay at Cuttack, Odisha. He started his training in classical music at a very young age, under the tutelage of his father. Acharya Kalipada Das & Chinmoy Lahiri taught him the khayal. He studied at St. Lawrence High School, Kolkata. He graduated with an honours in English Literature from Jadavpur University and did a diploma in the French language and the German language.

Around 1968, while learning Himangshu Dutta compositions, he felt that in spite of their compositional strength, they did not represent the contemporary times, lyrically.

Kabir Suman's first studio recording was in 1972. It was released from Hindusthan Records. His second single vinyl record was published in 1973, from the same label. Both these records were commercially unsuccessful.

After resigning from All India Radio he joined a clerical post at United Bank of India. Kabir Suman shifted to France temporarily to teach the basics of Indian Classical Music in 1973. It is said in one of his autobiographies, that in France he was first introduced to the songs of Bob Dylan and he claimed Dylan's songs left a great impression and influence on him.

Kabir Suman went to West Germany on 12 May 1975.. At the end of 1975, Voice of Germany opened a Bengali department in Cologne, and he applied for a job there. They gave him some translation work, and he gradually became a regular freelancer for the Voice of Germany's Bengali division.

In May 1979, Suman returned to Kolkata and he started to work as a teacher of German at Ramakrishna Mission Institute of Culture, Kolkata, and the Max Mueller Bhavan.

He started working in the Bengali daily Aajkal as a part-timer, and also contributed to the Desh until 1980. He joined a band called "Samatan". However, this band was unsuccessful and the members broke up very soon. Some members of Samatan and some new members, all in their twenties and thirties joined him to establish a new band called 'Nagarik : Anya Katha Anya Gan'. During this time Suman completed his first song (written in 1975) "E Kemon Akash Dekhale Tumi".

During this time Suman went to the US in to work for Voice of America. While working for Voice of America, Suman went to Nicaragua during Sandinista Revolution. He also wrote for Desh magazine under the pseudonym Manab Mitra during this time and also started writing in the 'Frontier' magazine.

Suman returned to Kolkata in early 1985. He bought many instruments, applicable for a complete recording studio, which were sent to Kolkata by ship. After returning to Kolkata, he rejoined with 'Nagarik' with some new vocalists and instrumentalists, and continued writing and composing songs, thinking mainly as group songs.

Breakup of Nagorik 
From early 1986, 'Nagorik' started swinging due to clash of personality. Kabir Suman created some songs at that time like "Hariye Jeo Na", "Tomake Chai" (finally published in 1992), "Aro Balo Aro Katha" (partially published in 1992), "Machhi O Mara Mukher Gan", "Najehal Akashta", "Robbar" (finally published in 1994), "Tumi Gan Gaile (finally sung by Indranil Sen and published in 2002), "Ganahatyar Nam Bhopal", "Tirikshi Mejajer Je Lokta", "Abhibadan" (finally published in 1994) etc. His initial compositions were created keeping the group in mind.  The group consisted of amateur singers and their aptitude was limited.  Members of Nagorik recorded some of his songs on cassette tape, the entire recording was planned domestically in his home at Baishnabghata. Kabir Suman himself had written, composed, sung and played electronic keyboard on the recording. There were some other vocalists and instrumentalists, instruments included guitar and percussions. The entire recording was done by his four track tape recorder, where live vocals and live instruments were recorded in two tracks by all vocalists, and Kabir Suman himself added more electronic sounds on the rest of the two tracks by playing synthesizer. His book "Mukta Nicaragua" about Sandinista revolution was published by K.P. Bagchi Publication at that time (republished many years later), but another book "Anya America" failed to get published. He also recorded some information and song about Sandinista Revolution at that time. During this time he constructed a recording studio named 'Sing To Live' inside an abandoned factory near Bansdroni.

1986–1989: In West Germany 
Kabir Suman was not sure about the future of his created songs, and also not interested to involve in a general job. He thought if he could go to a foreign country as an employee, he could buy many electronic music instruments. Thinking thus, he went to West Germany again in September 1986, and before departure he recorded another album of 'Nagarik', following the procedure just written before, but this time in the new studio he constructed.

Learning guitar 
After reaching West Germany, he started learning classical guitar. During this time he felt that guitar is a simple instrument, which could be played by a solo musician, and there is no question about any type of multi-instrument orchestra. Also a guitar makes a man moving-minded. Under an Italian teacher, he started learning guitar, with Finger-style, sight-reading, listening many guitarists' records like Andrés Segovia, Julian Bream etc., and also started learning jazz guitar & blues guitar. He then started song creation on guitar, like "Hal Chherho Na Bandhu" (finally published in 1992),  "Gan-ola" (finally published in 1994), etc. These guitar based songs started influencing of Baul, Bhawaiya, Kirtan, Folk, Blues and also some Ragas.

Suman returned to Kolkata in early 1989. He bought many instruments like before, this time both keyboard and guitar.

Struggling as a newcomer musician 
After returning to Kolkata, he saw 'Nagarik' has almost disbanded because of ego-clash, and the studio is also in a sinking mood. He decided to be a solo professional singer-songwriter and musician, and thought to work in some advertisement business, but nothing materialized. During this time he wrote some songs like "Tin Shataker Shahar", "Chena Duhkha Chena Sukh" (finally published in 1992), "Pratham Sabkichhu" (finally published in 1994) etc.

First public performance with own song 
In February 1990, a singer named Raju Bal took a gentleman Indranil Gupta to Suman's house. Indranil listened the "Tin Shataker Shahar" and liked it, and told Suman that Kolkata Festival was being held in Yuba Bharati Krirangan remembering the so-called tri-centenary celebration of Kolkata City, and that song relates with this, so he should sing this song at that festival.

He felt nervous because he was performing on stage after 17 years, and he was completely unknown, with his style. He sang "Tin Shataker Shahar" with guitar, then "Tomake Chai" and finally "Amader Janya" – both with electronic keyboard. The audiences became highly appreciative about his songs and music after hearing three songs and started applauding seeking encore. Kabir Suman felt very happy to realize that his song got the favour of the general public, and became optimistic. He started to practise his voice with the help of electronic tanpura, continued keyboard and guitar playing, and also creating songs with some contemporary incidents. Kabir Suman performed first time as a professional singer in December 1990. He got appreciation from Dr. Barin Roy, Gour Kishor Ghosh, Ashis Chattopadhay etc. Shubhendu Maity helped him by giving him a chance to perform in some concerts. His songs have not impressed the rural people, but urban and suburban people appreciated them very much. He also sang at some political meetings of the Communist Party of India (Marxist). During this time some controversy arose over one of his songs "Anita Dewan".

Solo live performance 
Kabir Suman performed his first solo live performance on 5 May 1991 at Shishir Mancha. Many magazines and newspapers were invited, like Aajkal, Desh, Business Standard, The Statesman, and they reviewed it. 'Desh' first labeled his songs as 'Sumaner Gan', which popularized his songs after this time and still now.

But although those reviews were positive, not many invitations other from than his friend circle happened. He performed in some live programs with the help of his friends. All those were very unsure, and Kabir Suman also was not optimistic at that time about his eligibility. Many people of advertisement business got him to do jingles or theme songs including "Lexpo 1991", but some of them either gave him not a single penny, others gave him very little money, despite the fact that Kabir Suman made all this work completely alone with writing, composing, singing, playing instruments, recording, and mixing. Some advised him to go to Mumbai for some professional work, but he refused it.

He went to Doordarshan Kendra Kolkata for some work, but he was refused. He went to Akashbani Bhawan Kolkata, and applied with the help of his friend and famous newsreader Tarun Chakrabarty. Ultimately he sang some of his own songs and some songs of Rabindra Nath Tagore, after 16 years, on the radio. In 1991 he went to film director Tarun Majumdar for some work in soundtrack. Tarun Majumder listened to some of his songs, and selected "Pratham Sabkichhu" to use in one of his upcoming films 'Abhimane Anurage', although he requested Suman to change some of his lyrics to match with the theme of that movie. The song was recorded in February 1992. Kabir Suman himself played guitar, Pratap Roy played synthesizer, and Samir Khasnabis played bass guitar. Unfortunately the film was not completed, and so the song was also not released.

First solo album 
Shubhendu Maity told Mr. Somnath Chattopadhyay, one of the officials of The Gramophone Company of India about the songs of Kabir Suman, and after Shubhendu's request, Suman sent some songs to Somnath after home recording. Ravi Kichlu, the head of the product development division of that company welcomed Suman, and showed interest to record his songs. Kabir suman felt very happy and surprised after listening to this, and asked Ravi about the reason for it, Ravi Kichlu told him  – "I will be doing a service to Indian Music". The recording started after some days in early 1992.

Tomake Chai 
Kabir Suman recorded 12 songs for his first album, named 'Tomake Chai', which was published in April 1992. In many aspects, it was a milestone in the history of Bangla Song. It was the first Bengali Basic Song Album which was entirely written, composed, sung and musical instruments played by the artist himself. It was the first Bengali Basic Song Album which was recorded with the help of a four track tape recorder.

On thé first pressing, it did not sell well, but after the 2nd pressing, it gained a huge success, and was a big hit. With its offbeat lyric, and instrumentation, it drew a great attention of the listeners, and ultimately it got Platinum Disc.

After much deliberation, Suman zeroed in on the name, Kabir Suman. According to him, "I wanted to keep the name my parents gave me, so I kept Suman. I took the name Kabir after Sheikh Kabir, a Bengali Muslim poet who wrote Baishnab Padabali."

Personal life 
 Suman has been married five times. He is married to Sabina Yasmin, a Bangladeshi singer. Suman has been candid about his personal lifestyle in media interviews, describing himself variously as "a polygamous man" and "a lusty old man looking for carnal pleasure".. In an interview with anandabazar he claimed that he performs sexual act regularly at the age of 75 and is alive only because of sex.

Musical life 
Kabir Suman, recorded a number of albums between 1992 and 1999 under the name Suman Chattopadhyay or Suman Chatterjee. He returned to the recording industry again in 2001, and this time as Kabir Suman.

His contemporary urban, socially conscious songs draw upon both Bengali adhunik (modern) and Western folk and protest music. His work has been a major influence in the development of the Bengali songs. It has influenced bands like Chandrabindoo, and has grown to become a major movement in contemporary Bengali music. Most of his songs are played solo with just a Piano, electronic keyboard or a guitar. Like many other Bengali singers, Suman recorded albums of Rabindra Sangeet (Songs of Rabindranath Tagore), starting in the late-1990s. 

He released his first solo album, Tomake Chai, on 23 April 1992, which was immensely successful as it redefined Bengali songs. Later Suman stopped making songs for general audience and focused on more political issues.

Basic song albums with his 'own created-own sung' songs 
In April 1992, Suman published his first album 'Tomake Chai', which had twelve songs. He sang, wrote and composed all those songs. Except three songs, all songs were accompanied by either electronic keyboard, or acoustic guitar, or both (mixed by a four track tape recorder and hardware sequencer) by him alone; those three songs were accompanied by tabla and percussion by other artists. The song Tomake Chai is the most famous track of the album. This continued to next album 'Bosey Anko', published in March 1992 along with twelve songs again. Unlike previous album, which was mostly accompanied by electronic keyboard and multi track mixed sound electronically, 'Bosey Anko' was recorded directly without any complex mixing except one song, which was mixed with both guitar and keyboard (and also with tabla and percussion). Most songs were recorded with a simple acoustic guitar, only two songs with an electronic keyboard, and four songs were accompanied by a sarod, tabla and percussion by other artists. This second album was also a big hit, and popularized Suman so much, that he was obliged to record his third album on the same year.

From his third album 'Ichchhe Holo', he started recording his basic albums annually as a 'Puja Album' like other artists during August of each year, until 1999. 'Ichchhe Holo' contained 14 songs, the first of such basic Bengali song albums. Unlike two previous albums, electronic keyboard was completely unused in this album. Most songs were completely accompanied by a simple acoustic guitar, and 4 songs were accompanied by sarod, santur, tabla and percussion by other artists. This fully acoustic music arrangement drew attention to many music-lovers, and it was such an album, which was completely electric or electronic music instrument less almost after 40 years in Bengali music history. It was also his first album which the front cover does not have a picture of himself.

In 1994, Suman recorded his 4th album 'Gan-ola', which contained 15 songs. He broke his own record, and also the record of Bengali music history because it was the first of such basic Bengali song album which contains such number of songs. By this album, he returned with his electronic music era again, with an updated, state-of-the art electronic keyboard with arranger facility. It was also his first album, where no other musicians played. All 15 songs were accompanied by either electronic keyboard, or acoustic guitar, among these, two songs were recorded with both guitar and harmonica. Some people believe that he had not used keyboard in any of his songs after 'Bosey Anko' – because he continued to practice this new keyboard, which was finally recorded in 'Gan-ola'. It was his second album in which the front cover does not have any picture of himself. His electronic music supremacy developed further on his next album 'Ghumo Baundule'. Although the number of songs reduced from 15 to 13, but it was another album, which was entirely accompanied by his musical instruments. In this album, all songs were accompanied with electronic keyboard, harmonica, acoustic guitar and electric guitar combination. It was also the first time in Bengali music history. All these mixing were done by both four track tape recorder, and hardware sequencer, which was unique and very hard to do.

1996 saw a big departure of Suman's music, because, in this year, his 6th album 'Chaichhi Tomar Bondhuta' published. It contained again 15 songs like 'Gan-ola', but the main exception is that it was the first and only basic album of Suman, where a music arranger, named Amit Bandopadhyay, arranged the instrumental part. Only 3 songs were accompanied by Suman's acoustic guitar, but other songs were accompanied by session musicians, with santoor, sarod, violin, tabla, dhol, drum pad, electronic keyboard, guitar and bass guitar. Also for the first time, some male and female background vocalists were used in some songs. Many hardcore Suman fans criticized and disliked this music, which was not alike with his previous albums.

However, in 1997, Suman returned again to his own instrumental music by his 7th album 'Jaatishwar'. It contained 12 songs again after 'Bosey Anko', and also like 'Bosey Anko' – most songs was recorded with a simple guitar, (this time with an electric guitar), only 2 songs with electronic keyboard, 1 song with keyboard, guitar and drums, another song with piano, guitar and harmonica, and 2 songs were accompanied by sarod, santoor, tabla and drums by other artists. The title song 'Jaatishwar' inspired then young Srijit Mukherjee, and he made a Bengali feature film with the same name in 2013.

In 1998, Suman published his 8th album 'Nishiddho Istehar', which was a stark contrast with his 3rd album 'Ichchhe Holo'. Where 'Ichchhe Holo' completely omitted electronic keyboard, 'Nishiddho Istehar' was entirely accompanied by electronic keyboard. It was one of the complex electronic music recording in Bengali music industry, where all 14 songs were accompanied by complex-customized electronic sound. After 'Ghumo Baundule', it was the first album where no other musicians played. This continued to his 9th album 'Pagla Sanai', which was published in 1999. Only 2 songs were accompanied by simple acoustic guitar, and 2 were with sanai and tabla by other artists.  All other songs were accompanied by electronic keyboard, and hardware drum programmer. Suman used both instruments very complexly, and created a complex orchestration alone. After this album, his next album was published again in 2001, after a long gap.

Basic song albums with his 'own created-others sung' songs 
Beside himself, some other artists have recorded his songs. It first happened in 1995, when Haimanti Shukla recorded an album 'Sobujer Pratishodh', which contained 8 songs. Amit Bandopadhyay arranged the instrumental music with many session musicians. Some female background vocalists were used in some songs. It continued in the next year, 1996 when Suman created an album 'Chhoto Boro Miley' with 14 songs. It was his first album mainly for children. Along with Anjan Dutt, Nachiketa Chakraborty, Lopamudra Mitra & Swagatalakshmi Dasgupta, some child singers sang most songs either single or as group, or as collaborative with those famous singers. Amit Bandopadhyay was also arranger here, but in 3 songs. Kabir Suman played acoustic guitar and harmonic in this album.

In 1999, there was another children song album 'Eksathe Banchboi' with 12 songs. Unlike 'Chhoto Boro Miley', here no other famous singers sang. All songs were sung by child singers, although they were not same of those in 'Chhoto Boro Miley' (except Payel Kar, who was in both albums). Also in this album, all songs were accompanied with electronic keyboard, and hardware drum programmer by Suman. Suman used both instruments very complexly, and created an ethereal orchestration alone. He also sang 3 songs collaboratively with those child singers, and he says that it was his best artistic work till now. In this year, another album published named 'Achena Chhuti', which contained 14 songs, where Suman sang with Sabina Yasmin. Some songs were sung by Suman, some by Sabina, and some as duet. The entire instrumentation was done by Suman. Only two songs were accompanied with guitar and harmonica, rest of the songs were accompanied completely with electronic keyboard, and sometimes with harmonica, like 'Nishiddha Istehar'. It was his first basic song album, where complete lyrics of the songs were printed in its album cover. It was his last collaborative album as 'Suman Chatterjee'. Initially it was published only as cassette, but later also as CD. It was his first album which was published from a recording company other than SAREGAMA India Limited; it was published from Raga Music.

Motion picture soundtrack 
In 1994, Kabir Suman debuted his Soundtrack music career. In this year, he wrote, composed, sung, and even played a cameo role in a Bengali film Mahasangram, which contained 6 songs. Amit Bandopadhyay arranged the instrumental music with many session musicians for all songs but one, where Suman played his guitar and harmonica only. Here Suman sang with Indrani Sen. Some songs were sung by Suman, some by Indrani, and some as duet. Background score was also done by Suman. Unfortunately the motion picture released after a long 12 years gap, in 2006, and was flop.

In 1997, Suman became music director again in a Bengali film Sedin Chaitramas, which contained 7 songs. Unlike Mahasangram, Suman played all instruments like electronic keyboard, guitar and harmonica and himself was an arranger like his basic albums. It was his first soundtrack where he worked with own instruments. Beside Suman, other singers in this album were Nachiketa Chakrabarty, Lopamudra Mitra & Swagata Lakshmi Das Gupta. Background score was also done by Suman. It became a hit for both the movie and soundtrack, and Kabir Suman received BFJA award as best music director. It continued to next year when he became music director again in a Bengali film Suryakanya, which contained 6 songs. Unlike two previous films, he did not direct the background score here. Suman played all instruments like electronic keyboard, guitar and harmonica and himself was an arranger like his basic albums. Beside Suman, other singers were Shrikanta Acharya, Shriradha Bandopadhyay & Swagata Lakshmi Das Gupta. The movie was a flop.

Songs created by Rabindra Nath Tagore 
Kabir Suman started his music career with Rabindra Nath Tagore's song in 1972, but it was almost unsuccessful. He recorded Tagore's song again 1994, after a long gap, this time he was already a popular singer. From 1994 to 1997, he recorded Tagore's Song each year as albums. These were published as 'Tumi Sandhyar Meghamala' in 1994, 'Pathik Ami` in 1995, 'Priyar Chhaya` in 1996 and 'Chirabhakta` in 1997. In first three albums, music was arranged by V Balsara, Amit Bandopadhyay and again V. Balsara respectively. In the album 'Chirabhakta', 7 songs were arranged by Amit Bandopadhyay, but rest 5 songs was sung by Suman with only a simple acoustic guitar, which was unique in the history of Tagore's song recording, and it was also permitted by Vishwa Bharati Music Board.

Songs composed by Himangshu Dutta 
1n 1995, Kabir Suman recorded an album which contained 10 songs, that were composed by Surasagar Himangshu Dutta, around 1940. All these songs were written by different lyricists. During its recording, Pete Seeger's 12 string guitar was played by renowned guitarist Buddhadeb Gangopadhyay.

After 1999, he returned in recording industry again in 2001, and this time as Kabir Suman.

Concert With Pete Seeger 

One of Suman's greatest critical success, was his concert at Kalamandir in Kolkata with American folk icon Pete Seeger, in 1996.

Basic song albums with his own created songs from 2001 
After a long gap throughout 2000, Kabir Suman returned to recording career again in January 2001, by publishing his 10th album 'Jabo Awchenay', which contained 10 songs. It was his first concept album about holiday, leave, vacation. Its theme contained 'leave' in many aspects like vacation, death, lost youth, holiday, break etc. After 'Nishiddho Istehar', this was his second album, which was entirely accompanied by electronic keyboard, except the last song, which was played with an acoustic piano. This was his first album, where there were some lyric reading, without any music and tune. There were such 6 lyrics. Kabir Suman had already changed his name from Suman Chattopadhyay to Kabir Suman, but the recording company still used his old name primarily, and his new name within brackets. The cover art was also a photograph of old days when he had hair, beard and moustache, where during that time, practically there were nothing to him.

Next year, Kabir Suman published his 11th album 'Adab', which contained 12 songs. This was almost his back to route effort, like 'Tomake Chai' and 'Bose Anko', which also contained 6 songs on each side. 5 Songs were played with an electric guitar, and 1 song with both electronic keyboard and guitar. Rest of all songs were played with electronic keyboard. This album was remarkable with four more points—1) Here his new name was used primarily, with his old name within brackets (unlike previous albums), 2) His then actual photo was used as cover photo, 3) It was his last album recorded in Saregama India Limited. 4) It was his last album which was published only as cassette. His next Bengali full solo album was published in 2005, after a long 3 years gap.

In 2003, he recorded an English song album 'Reaching Out' which contained 10 songs. All songs were completely accompanied by a simple acoustic guitar. 2 songs were translation of two former Bengali songs, but the other 8 songs were directly written in English. This was Suman's first solo album which was published from a recording label other than SAREGAMA India Limited. It was published from Cosmic Harmony, which continued to publish his next few albums. It was his first album, which was marketed with his new name Kabir Suman, which is continuing after that.

2004 saw a long-awaiting incident, when Kabir Suman and Anjan Datta recorded an album collaboratively. It was named 'Onek Din Por', which contained 10 songs, 5 each were written by each artist. Suman's songs were accompanied by guitar and harmonica, where Anjan's songs were accompanied by lead guitar, bass guitar and harmonica by other musicians. Anjan himself played acoustic guitar, and Suman accompanied him by harmonica in a song. This was a milestone in Bengali Music Industry where two renowned singer-songwriters recorded an album jointly. The effort was mainly from Kabir Suman, as his 12th album. It was also his first album which was published as both cassette and CD, and his first album recorded digitally.

Kabir Suman returned to his solo Bengali album in 2005 after a three-year long gap. This time he published his 13th album 'Dekhchhi Toke'. It contained only 8 songs, which was his first album with least contained song. This album was remarkable because, it was his first album where he not only recorded the entire music instrumental parts, but also mixed and finally mastered. It was the first Bengali album which contained songs that were written, composed, sung, instruments played, recorded, mixed and mastered by a single person. 4 songs were accompanied by electronic keyboard, and 4 songs by electric guitar. However its recording quality was a bit unclear and hazy.

His next Bengali full solo album 'Nandigram' was published in 2007, after a 2 years gap. It was his 14th album, and his 2nd concept album, and his first political album. Around this time, the political situation of West Bengal was in unrest regarding land acquisition at Singur and Nandigram. On 14 March 2007, many people were killed by police at Nandigram. At that time, Kabir Suman was a reporter of Tara TV. He went more than one time to those places, and arose high protest by both as reporter and singer-songwriter-musician. This album contained 8 songs, and one lyric. It was his second album which contained lyric reading, without any music and tune. The title song 'Nandigram` was sung by him without any kind of instrumental, it was also his first time. All the rest of the songs were accompanied with only electronic keyboard. All songs' theme was the forceful land acquisition from then state government, and brutal massacre by them. It was his third album after a long gap since 'Gan-ola`, published in 1994, in which the front cover does not have any picture of himself. The royalty of this album went completely to those ordinary persons of Singur and Nandigram, who were continuing protest against the land acquisition. His protest continued to the next year, when he published his 15th album and his 3rd concept album 'Rijwanur Britto` in 2008. It was his first album which was published in Kolkata Book Fair, and the only album which was published personally, without any help from any recording company. It contained 8 songs, and except one song which was played with guitar, all other songs were played with electronic keyboard. All songs' theme was mysterious death of young multimedia designer Rizwanur Rahman, which was very controversial, and created some political unrest in West Bengal. It was his first album which was published only in CD. During this period Kabir Suman gaining popularity again in view of his many protest songs, so he obliged to publish another protest song album in the same year. His 16th album 'Protirodh', which was also a political album and his 4th concept album., which contained 8 songs. All songs were accompanied by electronic keyboard, with some songs mixed with guitar a bit. Both of these albums published in 2008 did not have any photo of him on front cover. It is often called a sequel of 'Nandigram'. Like 'Nandigram', all songs' theme was forceful land acquisition from then state government, and brutal massacre by them, and the royalty of this album went completely to those ordinary persons of Singur and Nandigram, Both 'Nandigram' and 'Protirodh' became very popular to the then opposition party of West Bengal All India Trinamool Congress. They played it on various meetings, distributed CD copies in very low price to voters. This album was marked by two aspects—1) It was his last album which was published as both cassette and CD, because from 2009, the cassette manufacturing was completely stopped in India. 2) It was his last album published from Cosmic Harmony. His protest-mindness helped Trinamool Congress to stand him as an MP in then coming Lok sabha election. He sang many such songs in his election campaign.

After elected as MP, he returned again to music recording in 2010. This time he published his 17th album 'Chhatradharer Gaan'. and his 5th concept album, and his 4th political album. It contained only 8 songs, and all songs were accompanied by a simple guitar. No other instruments were used. It was his first Bengali album which he recorded entirely with guitar, without any other musicians. This album was remarkable because it was his first album after he became an MP. The main theme of this album was the forest area at western West Bengal, its people, their political situation, and some reasonless harassment from central government. During that time, Chhatradhar Mahato was arrested and imprisoned, joint paramilitary force was posted in that area, and they started harassing common people of forest area, saying that they are helping Maoists. For this sensitive reason, this album became controversial. Suman's party All India Trinamool Congress did not like his view, and repeatedly said to ban this album, and stop saying about supporting Chhatradhar Mahato, but he did not change his view, so the clash continued with him from other leaders, including AITC supremo, then railway minister Mamata Banerjee. This album was recorded by following an early stereo recording concept, i.e.—vocal on one side, and guitar on another side.

In 2011, Suman published his 18th album 'Lalmohoner Lash'. It was his 6th and last concept album, and his 5th and last political album. It contained 9 songs, and has a stark contrast with previous albums in view of instrumentation. Unlike 'Chhatradharer Gaan', which was completely accompanied by guitar, 'Lalmohaner Lash' was entirely accompanied by electronic keyboard. This album was recorded and released at that time, when due to his political view not supported by his party, the clash with his party was continuing. It is often called a sequel of 'Chhatradharer Gan'. Like 'Chhatradharer Gan', all songs were in favor of revolution of forest people living in western West Bengal, and protest against harassment caused by the central paramilitary force, operation Green hunt etc. During that time, Lal Mohan Tudu was arrested applying UAPA, and killed by the paramilitary force. A very sharp ear can listen a humming sound in the end of some songs, it was due to 14 Kilohertz crosstalk signaling. It was caused by some earthing problem. This album also does not contain any photo of him on front cover.

2012 saw the till now last album, which is his 19th album '63te'. After some political and concept album since 2007, he returned to a standard album. It is his first standard album after 'Dekhchhi Toke', which was published in 2005. It includes 15 songs, which was after long time since 1996, when he published 'Chaichhi Tomar Bondhuta'. Instrumentation was returned again to his old style, 4 or 5 songs were played by guitar, and all other songs were played by electronic keyboard. Due to his home recording like recent albums, some outside noise were unintentionally added with final recording. The humming problem with 'Lalmohoner Lash' was also present here in some of the songs.

Basic song albums with his 'own created-others sung' songs from 2002 
In 2002, Indranil Sen recorded an album 'Tumi Gan Gaile', which contained 8 songs. Sanjay Das arranged the instrumental music with some session musicians. Kabir Suman said a little speech in the middle of the title song. Complete lyrics were printed in album cover. It was his first collaborative album as 'Kabir Suman', and also his first collaborative album which was published as both cassette and CD.

In 2006, another album published named '13', which contained 13 songs, where Suman sang with Sabina Yasmin. Some songs were sang by Suman, some by Sabina, and some as duet. Among these, one song was written and composed by Rudra Mohammad Shahidullah. The entire instrumentation was done by Suman. Some songs were accompanied with guitar and harmonica, other songs were by electronic keyboard, and some were mixed with both electronic keyboard and guitar. Complete lyrics were printed in album cover. It was his first collaborative album, which was recorded digitally and instrumentations were mixed by software sequencer like Reason, Samplitude, and Nuendorum. It was his last collaborative album which was published as both cassette and CD. One song was previously published in 1994.

In 2010, Sabina Yasmin recorded an album 'Suprobhat Bishonnota', which contained 10 songs. The entire instrumentation was done by Suman. Some songs were accompanied with guitar and harmonica, other songs were by electronic keyboard, and some was mixed with both electronic keyboard and guitar. It was his first and till now the only collaborative album, which was published only as CD. A very sharp ear can listen a humming sound in the end of some songs, it was due to 14 Kilohertz crosstalk signaling. In some songs, background noise was also born, and to depress it, over-noise-reduction happened in some tracks.

Motion picture soundtrack from 2009 
In 2009, Kabir Suman returned again to Bengali film industry as a music director after a long gap. In this year, he wrote, composed, sung, and instruments played in a Bengali film 'Diet', which contained 3 songs. Here Suman played his guitar, electronic keyboard and all instrumental sounds were mixed by him. Two songs were sung by Suman, one by Sabina Yasmin. Background score was also done by Suman. Unfortunately the motion picture became flop, and there was no release of its soundtrack album. The movie was released at the time when he was elected as MP.

2014 was the greatest year of Suman as a music director. In this year, he directed music in a Bengali film Jaatishwar, which contained 21 songs. It had the most songs in a single film in the history of Bengali film industry. Like his first film Mahasangram, this movie also had another person as the arranger, this time it was Indraadip Dasgupta. In only one song, Kabir Suman played his guitar (with other instruments by others). Beside Kabir Suman, other singers were Rupankar Bagchi, Shrikanta Acharya, Manomay Bhattacharya, Suman Mukhopadhyay, Kalika Prasad Bhattacharya, Kharaj Mukhopadhyay, Dibyendu Mukhopadhyay, Saptarshi Mukhopadhyay, Anupam Roy, Sidhu, Saki & Shramana Chakraborty. It was the only Bengali movie so far—which had a Spanish song. Complete lyrics were printed in a booklet, included in this album. There was a way to use all songs as mobile phone caller tune. Both the movie and the soundtrack became a major hit, and Kabir Suman received the National Award for Best Music Direction. He also got Radio Mirchi Award for best lyricist, best compact disc, and best seller compact disc for this film.

Songs created by Rabindra Nath Tagore from 2002 
He recorded Tagore's Song again in 2002, after a long gap. This year, he recorded 'Kalo Horin Chokh' which had 10 songs, 2 songs were recorded previously in 1972 and 1994 respectively. It was the first Tagore's song album, where all songs were accompanied by either guitar & harmonica or electronic keyboard, which was played by solely Kabir Suman. An extended recording of this album as EP cassette 'Sondhyadiper Shikha' was published in next year 2003, which was 4 more songs, 1 of them was published in 'Kalo Horin Chokh'. It was his last Tagore Song album in both cassette and CD format. He recorded his next Tagore Song album 'Ganer Resh' in 2016, which was completely without any instruments. It was published only as CD.

Other recordings 
Beside those albums, he recorded some other songs, which were compiled on some albums like 'Onurodher Asor', 'Nagorik Kobiyal', 'Pata Jhore Jay', 'Ei Prothom' (a live album with Nachiketa Chakraborty) etc. He also recorded two songs for a Bengali Movie 'Bhoy' – which was recorded and released in 1996, and one song for a Bengali Movie 'Yoddha' – which was recorded in 1995, but never released. Concord Trio has recorded two Suman's songs in 1994 and one in 1997 respectively for their albums 'Konthe Nilem Notun Gan' and 'Tomar Safar'. Lopamudra Mitra has recorded two Suman's songs in 1995 and one in 1996 respectively for her albums 'Notun Ganer Nouko Bawa' and 'Bhetor Ghore Brishti'. From 1997 to 2003 (except 2002), Sandhya Mukhopadhyay has recorded two Suman's songs almost each year, those were published respectively in her albums 'Dhonno Hok', 'Shesh Dorjata Perole', 'Aschhe Shotabdite', 'Rongdhonu Tana Setu', 'Sada Payra Giyechhe Ure' & 'Osshomedher Ghora Chhutechhe', among them one song in 1999 won the best Bengali album award.

Digital songs 
Since 2011, Kabir Suman started posting his new songs on his website. During this time his 19th album '63te' was released as compact disc format, which contained some songs that were also published on his website. After that, he started completely releasing his new songs (as mostly audio format, sometimes as video format) through his website. Sometimes he releases some songs also through SoundCloud. All his internet-only songs are only playable, but not downloadable. It does not cost any money for listening those songs. It is first such example for a Bengali musician to release songs only in internet. Beside his self-created songs, he also released some Indian Classical songs and some old songs, created by late Dilip Kumar Roy and others.

Present Status 

Although he has not recorded any studio album since 2012 (actually his last recording in a professional recording studio occurred in 2008, since when he has recorded his studio albums entirely at his home), he has recently recorded two soundtrack albums in 2014 and 2016. He is continuing live performance on various stages in Kolkata and various towns in West Bengal as of 2017. He also sometimes performs live in some cities outside West Bengal, including both Indian and foreign cities, even outside of Asia. He also teaches songs in his house on weekends. Despite not being completely physically fit due to some nerve problems, he still performs a three-hour solo live performance, playing electronic keyboard (now simply an acoustic piano). Until recently, he played the guitar. He also sometimes plays melodica and harmonica at his concerts. Since 2013, he took some additional musicians in his concerts for playing additional acoustic guitar and electronic percussion/tabla.

Political activities 
Suman was a journalist in Nicaragua during the Sandinista revolution and wrote Mukto Nicaragua (Liberated Nicaragua) on his experiences. During the 2002 Gujarat riots, he composed songs in protest against fundamentalism. He is also noted for his strong declamations against political opponents in public. Since 2006, when Suman was involved in the land struggle in Nandigram, he started aligning himself to All India Trinamool Congress (AITC) led by Mamata Banerjee. His songs on the Nandigram land issues have been released on two albums, Nandigram and Pratirodh. Suman participated in the Singur agitation & other TMC party programmes on a regular basis.

The Trinamoool Congress nominated him for the 2009 general election from Jadavpur constituency in Kolkata, West Bengal, and won the election, defeating his nearest rival, Sujan Chakraborty of the Communist Party of India (Marxist) (CPI(M)) by 54,000 votes (by a 10% margin).

In November 2009, Suman had a dispute with the Trinamool Congress. He complained that the local leaders of the party were not allowing him to work, and his views were not taken seriously in the party. However, the issue was resolved amicably in a series of closed door meetings.

Suman has also been vocal in his support for the movement of tribals in Lalgarh, and has composed an album called Chhatradharer Gaan in support of the mass movement, going against the wishes of the party. Going against the party position, he has also expressed his protests against "Operation Green Hunt", the Indian Government's military operation where the Naxalites have some influence.

Suman, at the end of March 2010, claimed that he is going to leave Trinamool Congress and also his membership of the Parliament. On the request of Mahasweta Devi he postponed his resignation for seven days. Within a few days, however, he made a U-turn and declared on 7 April that he does not want to resign to prevent embarrassing the party further. Currently he conveys his political opinions through his own website.

Controversies

Allegations of domestic violence 
One of Suman's former wives was a German national. She reportedly accused Suman of domestic violence and filed a criminal complaint against Suman. According to The Indian Express, Suman's "messy divorce...and rumours of domestic violence didn't go down well with the people."

Support for ban on book by Taslima Nasrin 
Suman supported a ban by the Government of West Bengal on the book Dwikhandito, written by the Bangladeshi writer and activist Taslima Nasrin, for allegedly blaspheming the Prophet Mohammed. The ban was later lifted by the Calcutta High Court. Nasrin, referring to a television appearance where Suman denounced her book, has stated: "I did not fear the threats made against me by the Islamic radicals as much as the fatwa issued by Kabir Suman." Nasrin has alleged that she lived in fear following Suman's remarks, and described Suman as "communal" and "zealously Islamic", following his conversion to Islam. Academic Malvika Maheshwari has linked Suman's initial candidature by the Trinamool Congress with his support for the ban on Nasrin's book, as part of a "policy of 'Muslim appeasement'" by the party.

Abusive language towards a journalist 
In January 2022, Suman attacked in abusive language over the phone in a conversation with journalist Bittu Raychaudhuri from Republic TV. Suman's conduct was widely criticised and led to a criminal complaint being filed against him for attacking Hindu sentiments and misogynistic vulgar statements about women in West Bengal.

Discography: Solo 
Solo albums with track lists:

Tomake Chai (1992) – HMV

Boshe Aanko (1993) – HMV

Ichchhe Holo (1993) – HMV

Gaanola / Suman the One Man Band (1994) – HMV / EMI

Ghumou Baundule (1995) – HMV

Chaichhi Tomar Bondhuta (1996) – HMV

Jatishwar (1997) – HMV

Nishiddho Istehar (1998) – HMV

Pagla Shanai (1999) – HMV

Jabo Ochenaye (2001) – HMV

Aadab (2002) – HMV

Reaching Out (2003) – Kosmic Music

Dekhchhi Toke (2004) – Cozmik Harmony

Rizwanur Brityo (2008) – Artist himself

Protirodh (2008) – Cozmik Harmony

Chhotrodhorer Gaan (2010) – Artist himself and later by Bijalpa Music

Lalmohoner Lash (2010) – Questz World / Saptarshi Prakashan

63 te (2012) 

Since 2011, many old and new songs are publishing in his website and Facebook

Compilations and live recordings

Collaborative albums 

Onyo Katha Onyo Gaan Volumes I & II (1986) – Sing To Live [with Nagorik]
Nicaraguar Jonyo (1986) – Sing To Live [with Nagorik]
E Desh Tomaar Aamar (1991) – SFI / HMV
Konthe Nilaam Notun Gaan (1994) – Concord Records (two songs sung by Concord Trio)
Shobujer Protishodh (1995) – HMV (Haimanti Sukla)

● Choto Boro Mile (1996) – HMV 
[with Nachiketa Chakravarty, Anjan Dutt, Indrani Sen, Lopamudra Mitra, Payel Kar, Shalini Chatterjee, Sreetoma Ghosh, Shayari Das, Tanushree Haldar, Paromita Chatterjee, Reema Roy, Shubhanwita Guha and Reetomaa Gupto (All Composition: Kabir Suman)]

Notun Gaaner Nouka Bawa (1997) – Bhetorghore Brishti (1998) – HMV [two songs sung by Lopamudra Mitra on each album]
Dhanya Hok (1998) – HMV [two songs sung by Sandhya Mukherjee]
Shesh Dorjata Perole (1998) – HMV [two songs sung by Sandhya Mukherjee]
Tomaye Khnujechi (1999) – Soundtech Sabina Yasmin
Ochena Chuti / Gaane Gaane Duti Mon (1999) – Raagaa/Soundtech [with Sabina Yasmin]
Aashche Shotabdite (1999) – HMV [two songs sung by Sandhya Mukherjee]
Ekshaathe Bnachboi (1999) – HMV [with Sohini, Shinjini, Debdutta, Shidhdhaartho, Anirban, Oindrila, Shreya, Shilpi, Arindam, Chiranjeeb, Rajshekhar, Shongeeta, Gaargi, Arundhati, Indrani, Shoilangi, Gargi, Aakaash and Payel]
Rongdhonu Taanaa Shetu (2000) – HMV [two songs sung by Sandhya Mukherjee]
Shada Paayra Giyeche Ure (2001) – HMV [two songs sung by Sandhya Mukherjee]
Tumi Gaan Gaile (2002) – Prime Music (Indranil Sen)
Awshshomedher Ghora Chhutchche (2003) – HMV [two songs sung by Sandhya Mukherjee]
Protichhobi (2004) – No Audio Release [with Sabina Yasmin and Bnaadhon]
 Onekdin Por (2004) – Cozmic Harmony [with Anjan Dutt]
Tero (2006) – Cozmic Harmony [with Sabina Yasmin]
Suprabhat Bishannata (2008) – Cozmic Harmony (Sabina Yasmin)

Live albums and collaborations 

Onurodher Aashor (1994) – T-Series
Ei Shomoye Ei Dujon- Live at GD Birla Sabhaghar (1997) – HMV (with Nachiketa)
Tribeni (1997) – HMV [with Nachiketa Chakravarty and Anjan Dutt]
Notun Shurer Chnoa (1999) – HMV (with Sandhya Mukhopadhyay, Lopamudra Mitra, Haimanti Sukla and Swagatalakshmi Dasgupta)
Praan Khola Gaan (1999) – HMV (with Lopamudra Mitra, Nachiketa Chakraborty and Bhoomi)
Onyo Hawaye Onyo Gaan (2004) – HMV [with Lopamudra Mitra]
Pujor Shera Gaan (2004) – HMV [with Sandhya Mukhopadhyay]
Graphiti (2006) – HMV [with Nachiketa Chakravarty, Anjan Dutt, Lopamudra Mitra, Protul Mukherjee and Moushumi Bhowmick]
Onno gaaner bhorey (2009) – HMV (with Nachiketa)

Film albums 

Obhimaane Onuraage (1992) [Unreleased] – [Playback Singers: Kabir Suman]
Attojaa (1993) – [No Audio Release][Playback Singers: Kabir Suman, Haimanti Sukla]
Mahasangram (1994) – HMV [Playback Singers: Kabir Suman, Indrani Sen]
Bhoy (1996) – Beethoven Records [Playback Singer: Kabir Suman in two songs]
Krishnachura [Bilingual in Assamese (released) and Bengali (unreleased)] (1995) – HMV [Playback Singers: Kabir Suman, Haimanti Sukla]
Jodhdha (1995) – HMV [Playback Singer: Kabir Suman in one song]
Shedin Choitromash (1997) – HMV [Playback Singers: Kabir Suman, Nachiketa Chakravarty, Swagatatalakhi Dasgupta and Lopamudra Mitra]
Shurjokanya (1998) – HMV [Playback Singers: Kabir Suman, Sriradha Banerjee, Swagatatalakhi Dasgupta and Srikanto Acharya ]
Katha (2007) –  [No Audio Release]
Diet (2009) –  [No Audio Release] [Playback Singers: Kabir Suman, Sabina Yasmin]
Ranjana Ami Ar Asbona (2011)
Jaatishwar (2014) – T Series [Playback Singers: Kabir Suman, Rupankar Bagchi & others]
Shankar Mudi (2016) – R P Tech-vision [Playback Singers: Kabir Suman, Srikanto Acharya, Pratik Chowdhury, Raghab Chatterjee, Bidipta Chakrabarty & others]
Guhamanab (2017) – Amara Muzik [Playback Singers: Kabir Suman, Raka Bhattacharya]

Bibliography 
 
 Sumanami
 Mon-Mejaj
 Alkhalla
 Hoye Otha Gaan
 Kon Pothe Gelo Gaan
 Sumaner Gaan, Sumaner Bhashya
 Mukto Nicaragua
 Sumaner Gaan
 Durer Janla
 Nishaner Naam Tapasi Malik

Awards and honours 
 1997 – BFJA Awards – Best Lyrics for Bhai
 2014 – National Film Award for Best Music Direction for the film Jaatishwar.
 2014 – Mirchi Music Awards Bangla for Music Composer of The Year (E Tumi Kemon Tumi – Jaatishwar)
 2014 – Mirchi Music Awards Bangla for Lyricist of The Year (Khudar Kasam Jaan – Jaatishwar)
 2015 – Honoured with Sangeet Mahasamman by Government of West Bengal.
 2018 – Honorary D.Litt awarded by Kalyani University.

References

External links 
Official website

1950 births
Living people
Indian former Hindus
Singers from Kolkata
India MPs 2009–2014
Bengali musicians
Bengali male poets
People from Cuttack
Trinamool Congress politicians from West Bengal
21st-century Indian Muslims
Jadavpur University alumni
Converts to Islam from Hinduism
Lok Sabha members from West Bengal
Politicians from Kolkata
20th-century Indian singers
Indian male singer-songwriters
Indian singer-songwriters
21st-century Indian singers
People from South 24 Parganas district
Best Music Direction National Film Award winners
20th-century Indian male singers
21st-century Indian male singers
Converts to Islam
Islam in India